Mikkel Bødker (surname alternately spelled Boedker; born 16 December 1989), is a Danish professional ice hockey right winger currently playing for HV71 of the Swedish Hockey League (SHL). He was selected eighth overall by the Phoenix Coyotes in the 2008 NHL Entry Draft, making him the highest-ever drafted Danish player. He also features on the cover of the video game NHL 10 in Denmark and Norway.

Playing career
Bødker was brought up in the highly regarded youth hockey program of Rødovre SIK. In 2005, at the age of 15, he moved to Frölunda HC in Sweden, where he played on Frölunda's junior team. He had an impressive 2006–07 season with 49 points (19 goals and 30 assists) in 39 games. The team won the national junior championships, and Bødker also made his debut with the men's team in the Swedish Elite League.

After the season, Bødker was drafted by the Kitchener Rangers in the 2007 CHL Import Draft, and he joined the team for the 2007–08 season. He had a successful first season in the Ontario Hockey League (OHL), where he played on the Rangers' second line. He scored 29 goals and 44 assists for a total of 73 points in 62 regular season games. He enjoyed even more success in the playoffs, with 35 points in 20 games en route to helping the Rangers win the OHL playoff championship. In the Memorial Cup, he had six points in five games as the Rangers finished runner-up, losing in the finals to the Western Hockey League (WHL)'s Spokane Chiefs.

Bødker scored his first NHL goal on 12 October 2008, against Jean-Sébastien Giguère of the Anaheim Ducks. Bødker also played in the NHL YoungStars Game in 2009 at the year's All-Star weekend festivities in Montreal, Quebec.

In the 2012 Stanley Cup playoffs, Bødker had an impressive showing, scoring two straight overtime-winning goals in Games 3 and 4 of the first-round series against the Chicago Blackhawks. The Coyotes would go on to a franchise-record-setting playoff run to the Western Conference Finals, where the team ultimately lost to the eventual Stanley Cup champion Los Angeles Kings in five games. Bødker scored four goals and four assists during the Coyotes' playoff run. On 15 October 2014, Bødker scored his first career NHL hat-trick against the Edmonton Oilers to lead the Coyotes to a 7–4 victory.

Following the 2014–15 NHL season, Bødker became a restricted free agent under the NHL Collective Bargaining Agreement. The Arizona Coyotes  made him a qualifying offer to retain his NHL rights and, on 5 July 2015, Bødker filed for Salary Arbitration.

In the 2015–16 season, Bødker became the first player ever to record two hat tricks in one season against the Ottawa Senators. His first came against the Senators in Ottawa on 24 October 2015 in a 4–1 win. His second hat trick against the Senators came on 28 November 2015 in Arizona in a 4–3 win.

On 29 February 2016, Bødker was traded to the Colorado Avalanche in exchange for Alex Tanguay, Conner Bleackley and prospect Kyle Wood, to assist the Avalanche in their playoff pursuit. Ultimately though, Colorado would not qualify for the postseason.

With the Avalanche unable to come to terms with Bødker, he left as a free agent in the off-season, signing a four-year $16 million contract with Stanley Cup finalists, the San Jose Sharks on 1 July 2016.

On 19 June 2018, he was traded by the Sharks alongside Julius Bergman and a sixth-round pick of the 2020 NHL Entry Draft to the Ottawa Senators in exchange for Mike Hoffman, Cody Donaghey and a fifth-round pick in the 2020 Draft.

On 19 May 2020, Bødker agreed to a two-year deal with HC Lugano of the National League (NL), beginning in the 2020–21 season. He then signed a one-year contract with HV71 of the SHL, as announced by the club on 26 June 2022.

International play
Bødker's older brother Mads is a former defenceman with SønderjyskE Ishockey in the Danish league Metal Ligaen and a regular player with the Danish national team. The two brothers teamed up on the Danish junior national team at the 2007 Division I World Junior Championships and helped Denmark gain promotion to the top division for the first time. Playing against opponents up to two years older, Mikkel Bødker scored one goal in five games.

Bødker again played for Denmark at the 2008 World Junior Ice Hockey Championships. He finished second in team scoring behind Lars Eller, notching two goals and four assists in six games.

Career statistics

Regular season and playoffs

International

References

External links

1989 births
Living people
Arizona Coyotes draft picks
Arizona Coyotes players
Colorado Avalanche players
Danish expatriate sportspeople in Canada
Danish expatriate sportspeople in Finland
Danish expatriate sportspeople in the United States
Danish ice hockey right wingers
Danish expatriate ice hockey people
Expatriate ice hockey players in Canada
Expatriate ice hockey players in the United States
Frölunda HC players
HV71 players
Kitchener Rangers players
HC Lugano players
Lukko players
National Hockey League first-round draft picks
Ottawa Senators players
People from Brøndby Municipality
Phoenix Coyotes players
Rødovre Mighty Bulls players
San Antonio Rampage players
San Jose Sharks players
Ice hockey players at the 2022 Winter Olympics
Olympic ice hockey players of Denmark
Sportspeople from the Capital Region of Denmark
Expatriate ice hockey players in Finland
Expatriate ice hockey players in Sweden
Expatriate ice hockey players in Switzerland
Danish expatriate sportspeople in Sweden
Danish expatriate sportspeople in Switzerland